
Camp Howze was a United States Army post in Bongilchon, South Korea, until it was deactivated and turned over to the South Korean Army in 2005.

History 

Originally a US Marine Corps—divisional level—command post (1953–1955) for the 1st Marine Division.

In 1955, when the Marines departed Korea, the 24th Infantry Division of the US Army placed their headquarters on the site. In 1957 the camp became the division headquarters for the 1st Cavalry Division, which in 1960 named the camp after Major General Howze, who had organized and trained the division from 1921–1925.

In 1971 it became the headquarters for the 3rd Infantry Brigade of the 2nd Infantry Division. "The 3rd Brigade was responsible for the security of the United Nations delegation at Panmunjom and for the security of the American sector of the Demilitarized Zone. On 1 October 1992, the 3rd Brigade was officially inactivated and the Engineer Brigade, 2nd Infantry Division placed their headquarters at Camp Howze."

At the time of its deactivation in 2005, Camp Howze was the home of the Headquarters and Headquarters Detachment (HHD), Engineer Brigade, Second Infantry Division and the 44th Engineer Battalion. However the 44th had participated in the deployment of the 2nd Brigade Combat Team, Second Infantry Division, in August 2004, in support of Operation Iraqi Freedom and was subsequently redeployed to Fort Carson, Colorado, and did not return to Camp Howze.

On 12 September 2018 a dedication ceremony was held for the Omma Poom park, which was constructed on the site of the former Camp Howze.

Camp garrisons 
It was a garrison for the 1st Battalion of the 31st Infantry Regiment, which was "reflagged" (i.e. redesignated) as the 1st Battalion of the 5th Infantry Regiment in 1987.

Location 

The site of Camp Howze originated with the 1st Marine Division’s establishment of a command post at Tonggu.

Camp Howze spanned three ri administrative districts located in Jori-eup, which is a sub-administrative district of Paju-si, Gyeonggi-do:
 Front gate: Bongilcheon-ri (봉일천리) 
 Noejo-ri (뇌조리)
 Janggok-ri (장곡리)

In popular culture
Camp Howze was featured in Larry Bond's Red Phoenix, a 1989 techno thriller.

See also 
 List of United States Army installations in South Korea

External links 
 
 
 
  Image of a military topographic map that notes the location of Camp Howze.
  Image of the 24th Infantry Division’s headquarters (later named Camp Howze).
  Image of Camp Howze.

Notes

References

Installations of the United States Army
Howze, Camp
1953 establishments in South Korea
Military installations established in 1953